Christiaan "Chris" Stoffer (born 19 September 1974, Harderwijk) is a Dutch politician. As a member of the Reformed Political Party (SGP) he has been an MP since 11 April 2018. Previously he was a member of the municipal council of Nunspeet from 2002 to May 2018.

Chris Stoffer is a member of the Reformed Congregations in the Netherlands.

References 
 Parlement.com biography

1974 births
Living people
21st-century Dutch politicians
Dutch Calvinist and Reformed Christians
Members of the House of Representatives (Netherlands)
Municipal councillors in Gelderland
People from Harderwijk
People from Nunspeet
Reformed Political Party politicians
20th-century Dutch people